Gary Kuehn (born January 28, 1939, Plainfield, New Jersey) is an American artist who pioneered the Postminimal and Process Art movements of the 1960s.

Life and career 

Gary Kuehn was born in 1939 to working-class family.  His father was a machinist and a member of the Communist Party during the McCarthy Era.   After receiving his BFA in Art History at Drew University he was encouraged by his mentor George Segal to attend the newly formed MFA program at Rutgers University where he studied with Roy Lichtenstein, Allan Kaprow, and Geoffrey Hendricks.  At that time Rutgers University was a hub for the Fluxus movement and Kuehn attended the very first happenings which took place at George Segal's farm in New Jersey.  As a student, Kuehn produced a sculpture for the 1963 Yam Festival organized by George Brecht and Robert Watts in New Brusnswick, New Jersey and in 1964 he choreographed a performance at the Hardware Poets Playhouse in New York.

During the 1950s and 60s, Kuehn worked as a roofer and iron worker on large scale construction sites.  Kuehn's experience as a construction worker was formative in the development of his work, and shaped his relationship to the physicality of raw materials.  Kuehn states,  "I once witnessed an accident on a construction site where concrete spilled when we were building a foundation.  The wood structure broke and concrete poured and poured out of the sides and bottom. I thought it was amazing.  I was struck by how this geometric structure collapsed and the concrete spilled out over the landscape.  I posit geometry as the expression of the ideal, the pinnacle of rational thinking, and a source of authority..."

Kuehn's work was included in the groundbreaking exhibition Eccentric Abstraction curated by Lucy Lippard in 1966 at the Fischbach Gallery in New York.  Considered the first Postminimal art exhibition, Eccentric Abstraction brought together artists including Eva Hesse, Keith Sonnier, and Bruce Nauman who were subverting the rigid hard-edge Minimalism that was dominant at the time.

Kuehn's work was also included in the seminal exhibition Live In Your Head: When Attitudes Become Form curated by Harald Szeemann  in 1969 at the Kunsthalle Bern, which traveled to Museum Haus Lange, Krefeld and Institute of Contemporary Arts, London, and was re-staged in 2013 at the Fondazione Prada, Milan.

In 1967 after seeing Kuehn's work at an exhibition at Bianchini Gallery in New York, Kuehn was invited to Kassel, Germany by the art dealer Rolf Ricke to create new work for Kuehn's first European solo exhibition, "Gary Kuehn: Zeichnungen und Mini-Objekte." This began a lifelong friendship and working relationship with Ricke and prompted Kuehn to live in Germany for several periods throughout the 1960s, 70s, and 80s. In 1977 Kuehn exhibited in Documenta 6, Kassel and in 1980 he was awarded the DAAD (German Academic Exchange Service) Fellowship in Berlin.

Gary Kuehn has held a teaching positions at the School of Visual Arts, New York and the Hochschule Fur Bildende Kunste in Braunschweig, Germany.  He taught for 40 years at Rutgers University and holds the title Distinguished Professor of Art Emeritus.His first museum retrospective "Between Sex and Geometry" opened at the Kunstmuseum Liechtenstein in September 2014 followed by the 2018 retrospective exhibition "Practitioner's Delight" at the Galleria d'Arte Moderna e Contemporane in Bergamo, Italy.  He is represented by Haeusler Contemporary Gallery in Munich and Zurich.

Work 
His work is known for its fluid use of materials that undermined the psychology of dominant Minimal Art practices.    Using a straightforward and reduced formal language, Kuehn subverts pure geometric forms with content-driven, metaphorical concepts.  David Komary states, "The works seem like excerpts of a process, sequence, or chain of events that enacted through or by means of the given sculptural object.  Kuehn's focus is a concept of art that enables him to explore questions of geometry and form while also reflecting on and sculpturally negotiating aspects of expression, human experience, and self-perception.  His aesthetic approach is based on a certain idea about rationality- not in a formal or compositional sense but in a manner analogous to human and interpersonal experiences - which he understands as the relationship of objects to one another and their potential means of expression or attitudes."

Although Kuehn works with a wide range of materials, the unifying theme throughout his discursive practices is a tension between forms as evident in his Black Paintings and Melt Pieces.  In 1992 when he received the Francis J. Greenburger Foundation Award, George Segal wrote about the “rule-breaking” in Kuehn's work and said, “Artists [like Kuehn] who don’t fit comfortably into art historical categories have a terrible time.”  Kuehn's refusal to produce trademarked work explains why he was "unfairly sidelined by history" according to art historians such as Thomas Crow.

Public collections

 Albertina, Vienna, Austria 
 Bonn Städtisches Kunst Museum, Bonn, Germany
 Bristol-Meyers Squibb Corporation
 Continental Corporation, New York, New York and Cranbury, New Jersey
Denver Museum of Art, Denver, Colorado
 First Bank of Minneapolis, Minneapolis, Minnesota 
 Hamburger Bahnhof, Museum für Gegenwart, Staatliche Museen zu Berlin, Germany 
 Kröller-Müller Museum, Otterlo, the Netherlands
 Kunstmuseum St. Gallen, Switzerland
 Kunstmuseum Liechtenstein, Vaduz, Liechtenstein
 Ludwig Forum für Internationale Kunst, Aachen, Germany
 Lehmbruck Museum, Duisburg, Germany
 Mark Twain Bancshares, St. Louis, Missouri
 Museum of Modern Art, Quito, Ecuador
 Museum Ludwig, Cologne, Germany 
 Museum of Modern Art, New York, New York
 Museum Abteiberg, Mönchengladbach, Germany 
 Museum Haus Konstruktiv, Zürich
 Museum Morsbroich, Leverkusen, Germany
 Museum Moderner Kunst, Frankfurt, Germany
 Museum of Modern Art, Vienna, Austria
 Neuer Berliner Kunstverein
 Neues Museum Nürnberg, Germany
 New Jersey State Museum, Trenton, New Jersey
 Newark Museum, Newark, New Jersey 
 Sammlung Fried, Ulmer Museum, Ulm, Germany
 Staatliche Graphische Sammlung München
 Städtisches Museum, Leverkusen, Germany
 Staatsgalerie Stuttgart, Germany 
Stedelijk Museum, Amsterdam, Netherlands
Von Der Heydt Museum, Germany
 Wadsworth Atheneum, Hartford, Connecticut
 Weatherspoon Art Gallery, U.N.C., Greensboro, North Carolina
 Whitney Museum of American Art, New York, New York

References

Living people
20th-century American sculptors
Minimalist artists
Rutgers University alumni
1939 births
American contemporary artists
Postminimalist artists
21st-century American sculptors